Mapplethorpe: Look at the Pictures is a 2016 American documentary film about the photographer Robert Mapplethorpe, directed and executive produced by Randy Barbato and Fenton Bailey, and produced by Katharina Otto-Bernstein for Film Manufacturers Inc.

Mapplethorpe: Look at the Pictures, received its premiere at Sundance Film Festival in January 2016, followed by the international premiere at the Berlin Film Festival in February, and a world television premiere on HBO in April. The film was released theatrically in the US and UK in April 2016.

Selected cast
Debbie Harry
Fran Lebowitz
Robert Mapplethorpe
Paul Martineau
Brooke Shields

Reception
Izy Radwanska Zhang, writing for the British Journal of Photography, stated "Aside from telling a gripping story, Bailey and Barbato have succeeded in capturing the overwhelming sense of adoration and emotional paralysis felt by all those who were influenced by Mapplethorpe."

Peter Bradshaw, writing in The Guardian, stated that it was an "interesting if flawed documentary study", that "the movie is, for me, a little uncritical on the subject of Mapplethorpe’s weaknesses: his lucrative celebrity portraits now look, frankly, uninteresting" and  "for me, the problem with this film is that it doesn’t analyse Mapplethorpe’s much admired photographs of flowers. How seriously did the artist take these images – how seriously should we take them? Was it that pistels and stamens and petals resembled genitalia? Is that not the point? Or were the flowers simply there to deflect criticism, to underscore a spurious context and artistic good faith? It’s difficult to tell. This otherwise thorough study does justice to Mapplethorpe’s talent."

References

External links
 
 Mapplethorpe: Look at the Pictures on HBO
 Official trailer on YouTube
 
 

2016 films
2010s biographical films
2016 documentary films
American biographical films
American documentary films
Documentary films about photographers
Documentary films about gay men
2016 LGBT-related films
American LGBT-related films
2010s English-language films
2010s American films